Myanmar competed at the 2010 Summer Youth Olympics, the inaugural Youth Olympic Games, held in Singapore from 14 August to 26 August 2010.

Archery

Boys

Mixed Team

Athletics

Girls
Track and Road Events

Taekwondo

Weightlifting

References

External links
Competitors List: Myanmar – Singapore 2010 official site

2010 in Burmese sport
Nations at the 2010 Summer Youth Olympics
Myanmar at the Youth Olympics